Mom Song can refer to:
 "Mom Song", a track on the album Simply Mortified by BS 2000
 "Mom's Overture", an unofficial title of the song "Momisms" by comedian Anita Renfroe

See also
 Mom (disambiguation), for several songs titled "Mom"